Cody E. Erickson (born September 22, 1988) is an American professional stock car racing driver. He last competed part-time in the NASCAR Camping World Truck Series, driving the No. 41 Chevrolet Silverado for Cram Racing Enterprises.

Career
A dirt, ATV, and snowmobile driver for at least ten years prior to 2014, Erickson attempted to qualify for the NASCAR Camping World Truck Series race at the dirt track of Eldora that same year, driving the No. 82 for Empire Racing. He came up just short of making the race after not finishing well enough in the last-chance qualifier. After he failed to make the field, the team invited him back for a pavement start at Martinsville that October, which he did qualify for, finishing 23rd in the race.

Empire put Erickson in their ARCA Racing Series No. 82 car at Salem in September of that year, which was his debut in the series. He finished in the top-15 in his first ARCA start.

Erickson returned to Eldora to try to qualify for the race there again in 2015, driving a second truck for Empire due to Sean Corr being in the No. 82 that Erickson had driven the prior year. The second truck for the team used the No. 35 with leased owner points from Win-Tron Racing. Empire did this instead of fielding a separate truck of their own so Erickson could have a better chance of qualifying (which he successfully did). He went on to finish 25th in the race.

On September 15, 2020, it was announced that Erickson would return to the now-Gander RV & Outdoors Truck Series for the first time in five years, driving the No. 41 Cram Racing Enterprises Chevrolet at Bristol. Erickson returned to the team in the No. 41 for the new dirt race at Bristol in 2021.

Personal life
Erickson works as a farmer, an owner of two businesses, and an owner-driver of a dirt racing team in his hometown of Ulen, Minnesota. He graduated from both the University of Northwestern Ohio with a degree in High Performance and Chassis Fabrication, and Northland Technical College (in Minnesota) with a degree in Farm Business Management.

Motorsports career results

NASCAR
(key) (Bold – Pole position awarded by qualifying time. Italics – Pole position earned by points standings or practice time. * – Most laps led.)

Camping World Truck Series

 Season still in progress

ARCA Racing Series
(key) (Bold – Pole position awarded by qualifying time. Italics – Pole position earned by points standings or practice time. * – Most laps led.)

ARCA Menards Series West

 Season still in progress

References

External links
 

1988 births
Living people
NASCAR drivers
ARCA Menards Series drivers
Racing drivers from Minnesota
People from Clay County, Minnesota